The 1926 Harding Bisons football team represented Harding College in the 1926 college football season as an independent. Led by player/coach Clyde "Doc" Matthews, an actual third-year junior, the Bisons compiled an overall record of 1–5. Matthews would go back to being a player only in 1927, but for 1926, he not only coached while playing on the field, but he posed for team pictures in a coaching uniform instead of a player's uniform. Harding's yearbook The Petit Jean also hints at other players besides Matthews helping the team along as coaches during the year.

The 1926 season was met with excitement because of the upgraded schedule, signaling a feeling that the Harding program had truly arrived onto the scene of real college football, instead of playing mostly high schools and collegiate B or C teams. The 1926 schedule also marked the beginning of competition with Henderson-Brown College, which would one day become Henderson State University, a Harding rivalry that will reach one century in 2026.

The season was also significant for playing the Arkansas Razorbacks, although not the Arkansas varsity but instead the Razorback's Freshmen. The Arkansas head coach at that time was Francis Schmidt, who was nicknamed Francis "Close the Gates of Mercy" Schmidt, because of his love for running up the score on inferior teams. And the young Harding Bisons program was shown no mercy, losing 0-74.

Schedule
@Arkansas State Teacher's College 2nd String - L, 0-7

@Arkansas Razorbacks Freshman Team - L, 0-74

Subiaco College - W, 19-0

@College of the Ozarks - L, 0-25

@Henderson-Brown College - L, 0-52

Magnolia A&M - L, 0-21

References

Harding Bisons football seasons
Harding
Harding Bisons football